CP, cp. or its variants may refer to:

Arts, entertainment, and media
 Cariyapitaka (Cp), a canonical Buddhist story collection
 The Canadian Press, a Canadian news agency
 Child pornography
 The Christian Post, an American newspaper
 Competitive programming
 Club Penguin, a now defunct online multiplayer game 
 Creepypasta, a form of internet horror story
 Cyberpunk, a subgenre of science fiction

Enterprises

Transportation companies
 Canadian Airlines (1987–2001) (IATA airline code CP)
 Canadian Pacific Railway, reporting mark CP
 Central Pacific Railroad, a network of lines between California and Utah, US
 , a French public railway company
 , a Portuguese state-owned train company
 CP Air or Canadian Pacific Air Lines (1942–1987), a Canadian airline
 CP Ships, a Canadian shipping company, part of TUI Group
 Cathay Pacific, a Hong Kong-based major airline

Other enterprises
 C.P. Company, an Italian apparel brand
 Cedar Point, an amusement park in Sandusky, Ohio, USA
 Charoen Pokphand (C.P. Group), a Thai agribusiness conglomerate
 Chicago Pneumatic, an American manufacturer of tools and equipment
 Colgate-Palmolive, an American consumer goods company
 Connaught Place, New Delhi, a commercial centre in India
 Curious Pastimes, a UK-based gaming company

Government, law, and military
 Captain of the Parish, a (now mainly ceremonial) appointment in the Isle of Man (post-nominal letters CP)
 Central Powers, a military alliance before and during World War I, led by the German Empire
 Certified Paralegal, an American legal qualification
 Civil parish, the lowest tier of government in England
 Command Post, in military terminology
 Commissioner of Police, the top-ranking officer of the Police Force

Science and technology

Biology and medicine
 Cerebral palsy, a brain disorder
 Certified Prosthetist, an American medical qualification
 Ceruloplasmin, an enzyme encoded by the CP gene
 Congenital prosopagnosia, a type of inability to recognize faces
 Chronic pancreatitis

Chemistry
 Capensinidin (Cp), a blue-red plant dye
 Carbon monophosphide, a diatomic radical chemical compound
 Cassiopium (Cp), a name formerly used for the chemical element Lutetium
 Chlorinated paraffins (CPs), complex mixtures of polychlorinated n-alkanes
 Cp, a proposed chemical symbol for the element Copernicium (Cn)
 Counterpoise method, a way to correct for basis set superposition error in quantum chemistry
 Cyclopentadienyl ligand (Cp), read as "C P", the cyclic  fragment in a coordination complex
 The similar symbol Cp* ("C P star") represents pentamethylcyclopentadienyl, the  ligand

Drugs
 Chlorphenamine, a first-generation alkylamine antihistamine  
 Creatine phosphate, a chemical used to store phosphates in the body
 Cyclophosphamide, a medication to suppress the immune system

Computing
 cp (Unix), a UNIX command for copying files and directories
 Certificate policy, outlining (non)-intended uses of a digital certificate
 Circuit Probe, a method of wafer testing
 Code page, a table identifying the character set used to encode a set of glyphs
 Constraint programming, a programming paradigm wherein relations between variables are stated in the form of constraints
 Control Program, part of an operating system of the late 1960s; see CP/CMS
 Connection pool, a cache of database connections

Mathematics
 Complex projective space (CP), the projective space with respect to the field of complex numbers
 Mallows's Cp, a statistic used in model selection
 Process capability index, (Cp), a statistical measure of process capability

Physics
 Candlepower (cp), a measure of luminous intensity
 Centipoise (cP), a unit of viscosity
 CP symmetry, in particle physics, the product of charge conjugation and parity
 Cp, the specific heat capacity at constant pressure
 Pressure coefficient (Cp), a parameter for studying the flow of fluids
 Center of pressure (fluid mechanics), the point where the total sum of a pressure field acts on a body

Other uses in science and technology
 Cathodic protection, a technique used to control the corrosion of a metal surface
 Complementizer phrase, in linguistics, the syntactic head of a full clause
 Continental Polar (cP), in meteorology, a type of air mass
 Clock pulse, a signal type in electronics

Other uses
 C. P. (name), shared by several notable individuals
 Central Provinces (C.P), a former province of India corresponding to Madhya Pradesh in the post-partition republic
  (cp), a Latin phrase commonly rendered as "all other things being equal"
 Colored people
 see also colored people's time
 Commercial paper, in global finance, a type of promissory note
 Communist party, a political party that advocates communism through state policy
 Customer profitability, the profit a firm makes from serving a customer
 Member of the Passionists, a Roman Catholic religious order (post-nominal letters C.P.)
 compare, a directive to the reader to compare to a cited source (used interchangeably with "cf."); see List of Latin abbreviations
 Clipperton Island, a territory with exceptional country code CP
 Montenegrin Party (Crnogorska partija), a political party in Serbia